Semisi Fatafehi Fonua (1911 – 5 January 1968) was a Tongan noble and politician. He held the titles of Kalaniuvalu and Fotofili, and was a member of the Legislative Assembly between 1936 and his death in 1968, serving as Speaker from 1951 until 1958.

Biography
Born in 1911,  Fonua was educated at primary school in Niuafoʻou and Tupou College. In June 1932 he married Sisilia Tupou; the couple had three daughters and four sons. He became Kalaniuvalu in 1935 and Fotofili in 1955.

He was elected to the Legislative Assembly in 1936 as one of the Noble representatives for the Tongatapu constituency. He was re-elected in every election until his death in January 1968, also serving as Speaker and Vice-President of the Privy Council between 1951 and 1958. One of his sons, Sosi'ua Ngalumoetutulu, later also served as Speaker of the Legislative Assembly.

References

Tongan nobles
Members of the Legislative Assembly of Tonga
Speakers of the Legislative Assembly of Tonga
1911 births

1968 deaths